Rode may refer to:

People
Ajmer Rode, Canadian writer
Bernd Michael Rode (born 1946), Austrian chemistry professor 
Bernhard Rode (1725–1797), German painter
Ebbe Rode (1910–1998), Danish stage and film actor
Franc Rode (born 1934), Slovenian cardinal
Gautam Rode (born 1977), Indian actor
Hans Henrik Rode (1767–1830), Norwegian military officer
Helge Rode (1870–1973), Danish writer, critic and journalist
Hermen Rode (before 1465 – after 1504), German painter
Nina Pens Rode (1929–1992), Danish actress
Ove Rode (1867–1933), Danish politician
Pierre Rode (1774–1830), French violinist
Sebastian Rode (born 1990), German footballer

Places
Rode, Somerset, England
Rode Heath, Cheshire, England
Carleton Rode, Norfolk, England
North Rode, Cheshire, England
Odd Rode, Cheshire, England
Sint-Genesius-Rode, Flanders, Belgium
 Rode, a village near Moga, Punjab, India

Structures
Rode Hall, Cheshire, England

Companies
Røde Microphones, manufacturer of audio equipment

Other
Marquess of Rode, a former noble title in Belgium
Rode, a cable, chain or rope, especially one attached to the anchor of a small boat.

See also 
Road (disambiguation)
Roder (disambiguation), placename and surname